Arenibacter nanhaiticus is a Gram-negative, rod-shaped and aerobic bacterium from the genus Arenibacter which has been isolated from sandy sediments from the South China Sea.

References

External links
Type strain of Arenibacter nanhaiticus at BacDive -  the Bacterial Diversity Metadatabase

Flavobacteria
Bacteria described in 2010